Ditrichanthus is a genus of flowering plants belonging to the family Rubiaceae.

Its native range is Southeastern Nicaragua to Ecuador.

Species:
 Ditrichanthus seemannii (Standl.) Borhidi, E.Martínez & Ramos

References

Rubiaceae
Rubiaceae genera